Steroid hormone receptors are found in the nucleus, cytosol, and also on the plasma membrane of target cells. They are generally intracellular receptors (typically cytoplasmic or nuclear) and initiate signal transduction for steroid hormones which lead to changes in gene expression over a time period of hours to days. The best studied steroid hormone receptors are members of the nuclear receptor subfamily 3 (NR3) that include receptors for estrogen (group NR3A) and 3-ketosteroids (group NR3C).  In addition to nuclear receptors, several G protein-coupled receptors and ion channels act as cell surface receptors for certain steroid hormones.

Types

Nuclear receptors

Steroid receptors of the nuclear receptor family are all transcription factors. Depending upon the type of receptor, they are either located in the cytosol and move to the cell nucleus upon activation, or remain in the nucleus waiting for the steroid hormone to enter and activate them. This uptake into the nucleus is facilitated by nuclear localization signal (NLS) found in the hinge region of the receptor. This region of the receptor is covered up by heat shock proteins (HSPs) which bind the receptor until the hormone is present. Upon binding by the hormone the receptor undergoes a conformational change releasing the HSP, and the receptor together with the bound hormone enter the nucleus to act upon transcription.

 Nuclear receptors
 Subfamily 3: Estrogen Receptor-like
Group A: Estrogen receptor	(Sex hormones: Estrogen)
1: Estrogen receptor-α	(ERα; NR3A1)
2: Estrogen receptor-β	(ERβ; NR3A2)
Group C: 3-Ketosteroid receptors
1: Glucocorticoid receptor	(GR)	(Cortisol)
2: Mineralocorticoid receptor	(MR)	(Aldosterone)
3: Progesterone receptor	(PR; NR3C3)	(Sex hormones: Progesterone)
4: Androgen receptor	(AR; NR3C4)	(Sex hormones: Testosterone)

Structure 

Intracellular steroid hormone receptors share a common structure of four units that are functionally homologous, so-called "domains":

 Variable domain: It begins at the N-terminal and is the most variable domain between the different receptors.
 DNA binding domain: This centrally located highly conserved DNA binding domain (DBD) consists of two non-repetitive globular motifs where zinc is coordinated with four cysteine and no histidine residues. Their secondary and tertiary structure is distinct from that of classic zinc fingers. This region controls which gene will be activated. On DNA it interacts with the hormone response element (HRE).
 Hinge region: This area controls the movement of the receptor to the nucleus.
 Hormone binding domain: The moderately conserved ligand-binding domain (LBD) can include a nuclear localization signal, amino-acid sequences capable of binding chaperones and parts of dimerization interfaces. Such receptors are closely related to chaperones (namely heat shock proteins hsp90 and hsp56), which are required to maintain their inactive (but receptive) cytoplasmic conformation. At the end of this domain is the C-terminal. The terminal connects the molecule to its pair in the homodimer or heterodimer. It may affect the magnitude of the response.

Mechanism of action

Genomic 

Depending on their mechanism of action and subcellular distribution, nuclear receptors may be classified into at least two classes. Nuclear receptors that bind steroid hormones are all classified as type I receptors.  Only type I receptors have a heat shock protein (HSP) associated with the inactive receptor that will be released when the receptor interacts with the ligand. Type I receptors may be found in homodimer or heterodimer forms. Type II nuclear receptors have no HSP, and in contrast to the classical type I receptor are located in the cell nucleus.

Free (that is, unbound) steroids enter the cell cytoplasm and interact with their receptor. In this process heat shock protein is dissociated, and the activated receptor-ligand complex is translocated into the nucleus. It is also related to EAATs.

After binding to the ligand (steroid hormone), steroid receptors often form dimers. In the nucleus, the complex acts as a transcription factor, augmenting or suppressing transcription particular genes by its action on DNA.

Type II receptors are located in the nucleus. Thus, their ligands pass through the cell membrane and cytoplasm and enter the nucleus where they activate the receptor without release of HSP. The activated receptor interacts with the hormone response element and the transcription process is initiated as with type I receptors.

Non-genomic 
The cell membrane aldosterone receptor has shown to increase the activity of the basolateral Na/K ATPase, ENaC sodium channels and ROMK potassium channels of the principal cell in the distal tubule and cortical collecting duct of nephrons (as well as in the large bowel and possibly in sweat glands).

There is some evidence that certain steroid hormone receptors can extend through lipid bilayer membranes at the surface of cells and might be able to interact with hormones that remain outside cells.

Steroid hormone receptors can also function outside the nucleus and couple to cytoplasmic signal transduction proteins such as PI3k and Akt kinase.

Other

A new class of steroid hormone receptors has recently been elucidated and these new receptors are found on the cell membrane. New studies suggest that along with the well documented intracellular receptors that cell membrane receptors are present for several steroid hormones and that their cellular responses are much quicker than the intracellular receptors.

G protein-coupled receptors 

GPCR linked proteins most likely interact with steroid hormones through an amino acid consensus sequence traditionally thought of as a cholesterol recognition and interaction site. About a third of Class A GPCRs contain this sequence. The steroid hormones themselves are different enough from one another that they do not all affect all of the GPCR linked proteins; however, the similarities between the steroid hormones and between the receptors make plausible the argument that each receptor may respond to multiple steroid hormones or that each hormone could affect multiple receptors. This is contrary to the traditional model of having a unique receptor for each unique ligand.

At least four different GPCR-linked proteins are known to respond to steroid hormones. G Protein-Coupled Receptor 30 (GPR30) binds estrogen, Membrane Progestin Receptor (mPR) binds progesterone, G Protein-Coupled Receptor Family C Group 6 Member A (GPRC6A) binds androgens, and Thyroid Hormone and Trace Amine Associated Receptor 1 (TAAR1) binds Thyroid hormone (though not technically steroid hormones, thyroid hormones can be grouped here because their receptors belong to the nuclear receptor superfamily). As an example of the effects of these GPCR-linked proteins consider GPR30. GPR30 binds estrogen, and upon binding estrogen this pathway activates adenylyl cyclase and epidermal growth factor receptor. It results in vasodilation, renoprotection, mammary gland development, etc.

Sulfated steroids and bile acids are also detected by vomeronasal receptors, specifically the V1 family.

Ion channels 

Neuroactive steroids bind to and modulate the activity of several ion channels including the GABAA, NMDA, and sigma receptors.

The steroid progesterone has been found to modulate the activity of CatSper (cation channels of sperm) voltage-gated Ca2+ channels. Since eggs release progesterone, sperm may use progesterone as a homing signal to swim toward eggs (chemotaxis).

SHBG/SHBG-R complex 

Sex hormone-binding globulin (SHBG) is thought to mainly function as a transporter and reservoir for the estradiol and testosterone sex hormones.  However it has also been demonstrated that SHBG can bind to a cell surface receptor (SHBG-R).  The SHBG-R has not been completely characterized.  A subset of steroids are able to bind to the SHBG/SHBG-R complex resulting in an activation of adenylyl cyclase and synthesis of the cAMP second messenger.  Hence the SHBG/SHBG-R complex appears to act as a transmembrane steroid receptor that is capable of transmitting signals to the interior of cells.

See also 
 Membrane steroid receptor
 Nuclear receptor

References

External links
 
 

Intracellular receptors